Gwen Wentz Cheeseman-Alexander (born August 13, 1951 in Harrisburg, Pennsylvania) is a former field hockey goalkeeper from the United States, who was a member of the 1980 Olympic team that qualified for Olympics but did not compete due to the Olympic Committee's boycott of the 1980 Summer Olympics in Moscow, Russia. She was one of 461 athletes to receive a Congressional Gold Medal years later. She was a member of the team that won the bronze medal at the 1984 Summer Olympics in Los Angeles, California. She was also the goal keeper of the world in 1980. She coached many Division 1 teams and currently is a goalie coach at Washington and Lee University.

References

External links
 

1951 births
Living people
American female field hockey players
Field hockey players at the 1984 Summer Olympics
Olympic bronze medalists for the United States in field hockey
Sportspeople from Harrisburg, Pennsylvania
Medalists at the 1984 Summer Olympics
Congressional Gold Medal recipients
21st-century American women